KXXV (channel 25) is a television station in Waco, Texas, United States, serving Central Texas as an affiliate of ABC. Owned by the E. W. Scripps Company, the station maintains studios on South New Road in Waco, and its transmitter is located near Moody, Texas.

KRHD-CD (channel 40) in Bryan operates as a low-power, Class A semi-satellite of KXXV, serving the Brazos Valley. As such, it simulcasts all network and syndicated programming as provided through KXXV but airs separate local newscasts, commercial inserts and legal identifications, and has a different subchannel lineup. KXXV serves the western half of the Waco–Temple–Bryan market while KRHD-CD serves the eastern portion. The two stations are counted as a single unit for ratings purposes. Although KRHD-CD maintains a news bureau and advertising sales office on Briarcrest Road in Bryan,master control and some internal operations are based at KXXV's studios.

History
KXXV signed on for the first time on March 22, 1985, as an NBC affiliate. The station was originally owned by Central Texas Broadcasting Company, Ltd. Waco was one of the last markets in the nation to gain full service from all three of the traditional broadcast networks, which took 32 years. It switched to ABC at the end of the year, with NBC programming returning to KCEN-TV (channel 6). Central Texas Broadcasting sold KXXV to Shamrock Broadcasting in 1987. Drewry Communications purchased the station from Shamrock in 1994.

KXXV/KRHD added a secondary affiliation with The WB on January 11, 2002, following the sale of the market's previous WB affiliate, KAKW (channel 62), to Univision. KXXV/KRHD aired The WB's prime time lineup after ABC's late night programming, as well as two hours of Kids' WB programming on Sunday mornings. In July 2002, KXXV/KRHD ceded the secondary WB affiliation to Fox affiliate KWKT (channel 44) and its Brazos Valley satellite KYLE (channel 28).

A planned late 2008 sale of the Drewry stations to London Broadcasting fell through due to the late 2000s credit crisis; London Broadcasting subsequently purchased KCEN-TV. On August 10, 2015, Raycom Media announced that it would purchase Drewry Communications for $160 million. The sale was completed on December 1.

Sale to Gray Television and resale to Scripps
On June 25, 2018, Atlanta-based Gray Television, owner of KWTX-TV and its semi-satellite KBTX-TV, announced it had reached an agreement with Raycom to merge their respective broadcasting assets (consisting of Raycom's 63 existing owned-and/or-operated television stations, including KXXV and KRHD, and Gray's 93 television stations) under Gray's corporate umbrella. The cash-and-stock merger transaction valued at $3.6 billion—in which Gray shareholders would acquire preferred stock currently held by Raycom—required divestment of either KXXV/KRHD or KWTX due to FCC ownership regulations prohibiting common ownership of two of the four highest-rated stations in a single market (as well as more than two stations in any market). Gray announced it would retain KWTX and KBTX, and sell KXXV and KRHD to an unrelated third party. On August 20, it was announced that the E. W. Scripps Company would buy KXXV/KRHD and sister station WTXL-TV in Tallahassee, Florida, for $55 million. The sale was completed on January 2, 2019.

Programming
As part of a tradition with other former Drewry stations, KXXV airs an annual telethon, benefiting the West Texas Rehabilitation Center in Abilene.

KXXV carries any Baylor Bears games through the network's broadcast rights with NCAA Football.

News operation
KXXV currently broadcasts 29 hours of locally produced newscasts each week (with five hours each weekday and two hours each on Saturdays and Sundays). The station maintains a news bureau in Killeen to serve the western portion of the area, including Fort Hood. KRHD maintains a fully staffed bureau of reporters and photographers stationed in Bryan.

Notable alumni
 Brian Collins, best remembered as the sports anchor on Ball State's college news program fumbling highlights only to conclude with the catch phrase "Boom goes the dynamite."
 E. D. Hill (1986–1987) – reporter/anchor, best known as Fox & Friends Morning Anchor 1998–2006
 Gus Johnson – Fox Sports commentator

Technical information

Subchannels
The station's digital signal is multiplexed:

Analog-to-digital conversion
KXXV shut down its analog signal, over UHF channel 25, on February 17, 2009, the original target date, which full-power television stations in the United States, was to transition from analog to digital broadcasts under federal mandate (which was later pushed back to June 12, 2009). The station's digital signal remained on its pre-transition UHF channel 26. Through the use of PSIP, digital television receivers display the station's virtual channel as its former UHF analog channel 25.

References

External links

ABC network affiliates
Grit (TV network) affiliates
Court TV affiliates
Ion Television affiliates
Scripps News affiliates
XXV
E. W. Scripps Company television stations
Television channels and stations established in 1985
1985 establishments in Texas